P. Sterling Stuckey (March 2, 1932 – August 15, 2018) was an American professor of history, Distinguished Professor Emeritus at the University of California, Riverside (UCR), specializing in American slavery, the arts and history, and Afro-American intellectual and cultural history.

Biography
Stuckey earned his Ph.D. in history from Northwestern University in 1972. He was appointed Associate Professor at Northwestern in 1971 and Full Professor in 1977. He was Hill Foundation Visiting Research Professor at the University of Minnesota in 1970–71, a Visiting Research Fellow at UCLA in 1975-76, an Andrew Mellon Fellow at the Center for Advanced Study in the Behavioral Sciences, Stanford, in 1980–81, a Senior Fellow at the Smithsonian Institution in 1987–88; and a Fellow at the Humanities Research Institute, University of California, Irvine , in 1991–92. He was with the University of California, Riverside (UCR) since 1989, retiring in 2004.

On the occasion of the 25th anniversary edition of his fundamental book Slave Culture, The Journal of African American History published a 25-page interview with Stuckey.

Books
Slave Culture: Nationalist Theory & the Foundations of Black America, 1987, ; 2nd edition 2013
Going Through the Storm: The Influence of African American Art in History, 1994
African Culture and Melville's Art: The Creative Process in Benito Cereno and Moby-Dick, 2011
(with  Linda Kerrigan Salvucci) Call to Freedom: Beginnings to 1877, 2003, 
(with  Linda Kerrigan Salvucci) Call to Freedom: Beginnings to 1914 (3rd edition)

References

1932 births
2018 deaths
American historians